John Joseph Mitty (January 20, 1884 – October 15, 1961) was an American prelate of the Roman Catholic Church. He served as the third Bishop of Salt Lake City (1926–1932) and the fourth Archbishop of San Francisco (1935–1961).

Early life and education
John Mitty was born in the Greenwich Village section of New York City, the son of John and Mary (née Murphy) Mitty. He received his early education at the parochial school of St. Joseph's Church in  New York. In 1896, he enrolled at De La Salle Institute. He was orphaned at age fourteen.

Mitty attended Manhattan College, where he earned a Bachelor of Arts degree in 1901. He then began his studies for the priesthood at St. Joseph's Seminary in Yonkers, New York.

Priesthood
On December 22, 1906, Mitty was ordained a priest for the Archdiocese of New York by Archbishop John Farley. He continued his studies at the Catholic University of America in Washington, D.C., where he earned a Bachelor of Sacred Theology degree in 1907. The following year he received a doctorate in theology from the Major Pontifical Seminary in Rome.

Following his return to New York City in 1909, Mitty briefly served as a curate at St. Veronica Parish in the West Village of Manhattan. From 1909 to 1917, he was a professor of dogmatic theology at St. Joseph's Seminary. One of Mitty's students at St. Joseph's was future Cardinal James McIntyre. During World War I, Mitty served as a chaplain in the U.S. Army, serving with the American Expeditionary Forces, 49th Infantry Division, and 101st Airborne Division in France. He was attached to two New York regiments that participated in the 1918 Meuse-Argonne Offensive.

Mitty was released from military service in 1919, and subsequently assigned as pastor of Sacred Heart Parish in Highland Falls, New York. In addition to his pastoral duties, he served as a Catholic chaplain at the United States Military Academy at West Point from 1919 to 1922.  In 1922, Archbishop Patrick Hayes named Mitty pastor of St. Luke Parish in the Bronx.

Episcopacy

Salt Lake City
On June 21, 1926, Mitty was appointed the third bishop of the Diocese of Salt Lake City by Pope Pius XI. He received his episcopal consecration on September 6, 1926. from Cardinal Patrick Hayes, with Bishops John Dunn and Daniel Curley serving as co-consecrators, at St. Patrick's Cathedral in New York City.

Mitty inherited a diocese deeply in debt. His predecessor had resorted to taking out new loans to pay the interest on previous debt, and left the diocese owing over $300,000. Mitty took control of the finances, focusing on improving the weekly offertory collection. When he left in 1932, the diocese was beginning to pay off its debts, and his successor was able to finish paying them off in 1936.

San Francisco

In 1932 Pius XI appointed Mitty to be the coadjutor bishop to the Archdiocese of San Francisco and named him titular archbishop of Aegina. Upon Archbishop Edward Hanna's retirement on March 2, 1935, Mitty succeeded as archbishop. He was installed as archbishop and presented the pallium, the symbol of a metropolitan bishop, at a Pontifical High Mass at the Cathedral of Saint Mary of the Assumption in San Francisco in September of that year. During his time as the Archbishop he lived at the Archbishop's Mansion in San Francisco.

Mitty worked to rebuild or establish Catholic institutions in the archdiocese. His first act as archbishop was to direct his installation gift from the clergy to restoring Saint Patrick Seminary. He had the archdiocese purchase the foreclosed upon St. Mary's College of California in 1937, and reopened the college in 1938. In the twenty six years of his episcopate, 84 parishes and missions were founded in the archdiocese, and over 500 building projects were completed.

Mitty caused controversy when he called for a boycott of the San Francisco News for factually reporting that a priest of the archdiocese was arrested, pleaded guilty, and fined for drunk driving, calling the coverage anti-Catholic. He joined with several other American bishops and archbishops in criticizing the 1945 Moscow Declaration, particularly questioning the Soviet Union's motives.

In 1951, Mitty approved the establishment of the Western Association of the Sovereign Military Order of Malta in San Francisco for the Western United States. He presided at the first investiture ceremony of the association in 1953.

Death and legacy 
John Mitty died of a heart attack at Saint Patrick's Seminary in Menlo Park, California on October 15, 1961. He is buried in the Archbishops' Crypt at Holy Cross Cemetery in  Colma, California. Archbishop Mitty High School in San Jose, California, is named for him.

References

Catholics from New York (state)
Catholics from Utah
Roman Catholic archbishops of San Francisco
Clergy from New York City
World War I chaplains
Saint Joseph's Seminary (Dunwoodie) alumni
Catholic University of America alumni
Roman Catholic bishops of Salt Lake City
20th-century Roman Catholic archbishops in the United States
1884 births
1961 deaths
Manhattan College alumni
United States Army chaplains
People from Greenwich Village
Military personnel from New York City
Burials at Holy Cross Cemetery (Colma, California)